Yeison Murillo Mena (born 15 November 1993) is a Colombian professional footballer who plays as a defender for Deportivo Riestra.

Career
Murillo played for Estudiantes between 2015 and 2017, making his debut for them on 19 July 2015 during a Primera B Nacional home defeat to Patronato. In total, Murillo made thirty-seven appearances in three seasons with the club. On 18 August 2017, Murillo moved across the second tier to Deportivo Riestra. He participated in fourteen fixtures in the 2017–18 Primera B Nacional as they suffered relegation to Primera B Metropolitana; a division that saw him appear in thirty-two of their thirty-eight 2018–19 league fixtures.

Career statistics
.

References

External links

1993 births
Living people
People from Quibdó
Colombian footballers
Association football defenders
Colombian expatriate footballers
Expatriate footballers in Argentina
Colombian expatriate sportspeople in Argentina
Primera Nacional players
Primera B Metropolitana players
Club Sportivo Estudiantes players
Deportivo Riestra players
Sportspeople from Chocó Department